Sturgeon is a census-designated place (CDP) in Allegheny County, Pennsylvania, United States.  The community was part of the Sturgeon-Noblestown CDP for the 2000 census, but was split into two separate CDP's for the 2010 census.  The population of Sturgeon was 1,611 at the 2020 census.

Geography
Sturgeon is located at  (40.3835, -80.2152).

References

Census-designated places in Allegheny County, Pennsylvania
Pittsburgh metropolitan area
Census-designated places in Pennsylvania